The Massarinaceae are a family of fungi in the order Pleosporales. Although taxa have a cosmopolitan distribution, they are better-known in temperate regions. They are thought to be saprobic in wood and bark; some species are weak pathogens.

In 2013, Quaedvlieg and colleagues expanded this family with the genus Stagonospora by showing that the type of the genus (Stagonospora paludosa) actually clustered inside the Massarinaceae and not in the Phaeosphaeriaceae as was previously assumed. Subsequently, Stagonospora, which has several important pathogens on grasses (e.g. Stagonospora nodorum and S. avenae), was  renamed Parastagonospora.

Genera
Bertiella 
Byssothecium 
Epiphegia 
Helminthosporiella 
Helminthosporium 
Massarina 
Massarinula 
Phragmocamarosporium 
Phragmosperma 
Pseudodiaporthe 
Pseudodidymosphaeria 
Vaginatispora

References

Dothideomycetes families
Pleosporales
Taxa described in 1956
Taxa named by Anders Munk